The Quad Cities is a region of cities in the U.S. states of Iowa and Illinois.

Quad Cities may also refer to:

Geography

 Florence-Muscle Shoals Metropolitan Area, in Alabama, United States
 Quad Cities Metropolitan Area, the metropolitan area associated with the Quad Cities in Iowa and Illinois
 Quad Cities (Minnesota), the cities of Virginia, Eveleth, Gilbert, and Mountain Iron in Minnesota, United States
 Quad Cities (Arizona), Prescott, Arizona in the United States, and nearby cities

Other uses
 Quad Cities (train), a planned Amtrak train to the Iowa-Illinois Quad Cities
 Quad Cities Rocket, a defunct Chicago, Rock Island and Pacific Railroad train to the Iowa-Illinois Quad Cities
 Quad City DJ's, an American hip-hop music group
 Quad Cities Nuclear Generating Station, an Illinois nuclear power plant.

See also